The Tender Hook is a 2008 Australian film noir directed by Jonathan Ogilvie and starring Hugo Weaving, Rose Byrne and Matthew Le Nevez. The film was retitled The Boxer and the Bombshell for its North American DVD release.

Plot synopsis
The film tells the story of a love triangle set in a stylised version of Sydney's criminal/boxing underworld in the 1920s. The story is about Iris' rise to the apex of a love/power triangle that includes her English con man, lover, McHeath, and Art an honest, young boxer. Within the flawed moral landscape each character struggles to establish their sovereignty.

Cast
Hugo Weaving as McHeath
Rose Byrne as Iris
Matt Le Nevez as Art Walker
Pia Miranda as Daisy
Luke Carroll as Alby "Othello" O'Shea
John Batchelor as Ronnie
Tyler Coppin as Donnie

Production
The Tender Hook is the second feature by writer/director Jonathan Ogilvie, and stars Hugo Weaving, Rose Byrne, and Matt Le Nevez.

Producers are Michelle Harrison and John Brousek.

The crew includes: director of photography, Geoffery Simpson; editor, Ken Sallows; production designer, Peter Baxter; costume designer, Cappi Ireland and composition of the score by Chris Abrahams from The Necks.

The film was financed by the Film Finance Corporation Australia, and Parkland Pictures (UK), with support from Film Victoria. Parkland Pictures (UK) handled international sales, with Icon Films distributing in Australasia.

Reception
The film was not a box-office success, earning only $64,232 against its $7 million budget.

Critics gave the film negative to average reviews. David Stratton and Margaret Pomeranz both gave the film 3 out of 5 stars, with Stratton explaining the film has "some very strong elements... [but] never really works as a thriller or as a romance".

See also
Cinema of Australia

References

External links
 

2008 films
Australian neo-noir films
Australian drama films
Films set in the 1920s
Films set in Sydney
Films set in Brisbane
2008 drama films
2000s English-language films